Benjamin Garver Lamme (January 12, 1864 – July 8, 1924) was an American electrical engineer and chief engineer at Westinghouse, where he was responsible for the design of electrical power machines. Lamme created an efficient induction motor from Nikola Tesla's  patents and went on to design the giant Niagara Falls generators and motors and the power plant of the Manhattan Elevated Railway in New York City.

Biography
Lamme was born on a farm near Springfield, Ohio, on 12 January 1864. From an early age he tinkered with machinery and made experiments of his ideas on the Lamme family farm. He liked things that rotated, especially at high speed. In later years he was able to solve complex problems in his engineering work using mental calculations.  Lamme graduated from Olive Branch High School near New Carlisle, Ohio in 1883 and subsequently entered Ohio State University and graduated with an engineering degree in 1888.

In early 1889, Lamme read an article about Westinghouse forming the Philadelphia Natural Gas Company of Pittsburgh. Westinghouse hired Lamme and within a few months transferred him to the Westinghouse Electric Company.

Lamme took over the stalled project of developing a practical version of Nikola Tesla's patented induction motor from Westinghouse engineer Charles F. Scott and came up with a more efficient cage winding design. Over a period of several years, he designed a variety of electrical motors and generators. Among his eight US patents were inventions on induction motors, electrical ship propulsion, and Gyroscopic stabilizer systems.  He designed the single-reduction motor for street railways (replacing the double-reduction motors), the Rotary Converter, railroad electrification systems, the Westinghouse Type C Induction Motor, and the first 5000 kW generators for the giant hydroelectric generators in the Adams Power Plant at Niagara Falls, for many years the largest power station in the world.  Bertha Lamme Feicht worked alongside her brother in the design of the turbogenerator at Niagara Falls.  Operation began locally in 1895 and power was transmitted to Buffalo, New York, in 1896.

Lamme spent many years developing advanced analysis and computational methods for designing and predicting the performance of electrical machines, doing much of the work at night because he had other duties assigned to him during the day. Among other available employees, no one else seemed able to do the computational work, so  Bertha, who like her brother Benjamin had an engineering degree from Ohio State University, was recruited to aid with the computation. After a few years, she left Westinghouse to get married. The importance of Lamme's methodology was realized in 1893 when Westinghouse began designing the first Niagara Falls 5000 kW generators. Lamme designed much of the apparatus for the Westinghouse exhibit at the Columbian Exposition in Chicago in 1893, including alternating-current generators, induction motors, and rotary converters. In addition to his design work on the Niagara Falls alternators, Lamme designed the “monster machines” for the power plant of the Manhattan Elevated Railway in New York City.

Lamme became chief engineer at Westinghouse in 1903 and held the position for the rest of his life.

The New York, New Haven and Hartford Railway adopted the Lamme’s single-phase electric rail system in 1905.

In 1915, Lamme was nominated by the American Institute of Electrical Engineers (AIEE, in 1963 merged into IEEE) and was appointed by the Secretary of the Navy to represent the AIEE on the Naval Consulting Board.

Lamme died July 8, 1924 in Pittsburgh, Pennsylvania, at the age of 60. In his will, he established the AIEE Lamme Medal to recognize members of the AIEE for 'meritorious achievement in the development of electrical apparatus or machinery.'  His will also provided for a gold medal to be awarded by the American Society for Engineering Education for accomplishment in technical teaching.

Career
As technology advanced, one of Mr. Lamme’s responsibilities was to recruit, evaluate, and train new engineering graduates employed by the Westinghouse Company. He developed criteria for selecting the most talented persons for the design engineering work. He developed and taught the Westinghouse Engineering Course in which those selected spent full-time for six months. Lamme’s great interest in the people with whom he worked was returned by their affection, esteem and admiration for him as a great engineer. He was addressed by his friends and colleagues as well as his family by the affectionate “B.G.”   Lamme was very fond of classical music and accumulated a large collection of records.

Awards
Lamme received the IEEE Edison Medal on May 16, 1919, in the Auditorium of the Engineering Societies Building-the site that preceded the United Engineering Building of recent times-in New York City. The citation was “For Invention and Development of Electrical Machinery.”  The Edison Medal is presented for “a career of meritorious achievements in electrical science or electrical engineering or electrical arts.” On January 12, 1923 Ohio State University presented Mr. Lamme with the Joseph Sullivant Medal; the initial presentation of that award.

He received the 1918 AIEE Edison Medal for his contributions to the electrical power field.

Personal life 
Lamme never married and made his home with his sisters. His sister and fellow Ohio State graduate, Bertha Lamme Feicht (1869–1943) was the nation’s first woman electrical engineer and the first woman who graduated in a major field of engineering other than areas related to civil engineering. She worked at Westinghouse as an electrical design engineer under her brother’s direction until her marriage to fellow Westinghouse engineer, Russel Feicht.  Bertha worked on the turbogenerator for the Niagara Falls project. 

In his will he also provided that a gold medal be presented annually to a technical graduate of his alma mater, Ohio State University, for "meritorious achievement in engineering."

Engineering papers 
 Electrical Engineering papers (Westinghouse, Pittsburgh, 1919)

US Patents
 Control system, 1924
 Gyroscopic stabilizer system, 1922
 Driving system for gyroscopic stabilization, 1922
 Means for preventing commutator flashing, 1921
 System of electrical ship propulsion, 1921
 Speed control for induction motors, 1921
 Speed control for induction motors, 1920
 Speed control for induction motors, 1920

See also
 IEEE Lamme Medal

References

Sources
IEEE Global History Network - Benjamin G. Lamme

The Benjamin G. Lamme Meritorious Achievement Medal
Benjamin Garver Lamme: Electrical Engineer; an Autobiography by Benjamin Garver Lamme, Adolphus Mansfield Dudley, 1926

1864 births
1924 deaths
People from Clark County, Ohio
American electrical engineers
IEEE Edison Medal recipients
Ohio State University College of Engineering alumni
Naval Consulting Board
Engineers from Ohio